The Watchman is a 2007 detective novel by Robert Crais. It is the eleventh in a series of linked novels centering on private investigator Elvis Cole and his partner Joe Pike.

Awards
The novel won the Barry Award for the Best Thriller of 2007 and the Mystery Ink Gumshoe Award for the Best Thriller of 2007; and was nominated for both the 2007 Anthony Award for "Best Novel" and the International Thriller Writers Thriller Award.

References

2007 American novels
Novels by Robert Crais
Barry Award-winning works